Dubton railway station (also known as Dubton Junction railway station) served the village of Hillside, Scotland and the nearby hamlet of Dubton, after which it is named.

History 
The station opened on 1 February 1848 on the Aberdeen Railway. It closed to passengers on 4 August 1952 and completely on 4 September 1967.

References

External links 

Disused railway stations in Angus, Scotland
Former Caledonian Railway stations
Railway stations in Great Britain opened in 1848
Railway stations in Great Britain closed in 1952
1848 establishments in Scotland
1967 disestablishments in Scotland